Paige Capistran (born May 7, 1998) is a retired American ice hockey player who last played for the Boston Pride in the National Women's Hockey League and the Northeastern Huskies in the NCAA.

Career 
Across 145 NCAA games, she scored 30 points. As a senior she served as team captain of the Northeastern Huskies. She was the first Northeastern player to win the Hockey East Sportsmanship Award.
Capistran was drafted 30th overall by the Boston Pride in the 2020 NWHL Draft. She signed her first professional contract with the team ahead of the 2020-21 NWHL season.  She retired from professional hockey following the 2021-2022 season.

Personal life 
Capistran majored in communications at Northeastern University.

Career stats

Source

Honors 
2016-2017 WHEA All-Academic Team
2019-2020 American Hockey Coaches Association American Scholar
2019-2020 Hockey East Sportsmanship Award Winner
2019-2020 Finished her career with 145 games played (tied for sixth-most all-time at NU)
2019-2020 Hockey East All-Academic Team
Source

References

External links
 
 
 

1998 births
Living people
American women's ice hockey forwards
Boston Pride players
Northeastern Huskies women's ice hockey players
Ice hockey people from New Hampshire
Premier Hockey Federation players
Sportspeople from Manchester, New Hampshire